"Wasting My Young Years" is a song by English indie pop trio London Grammar. The song was released as a digital download in the United Kingdom on 16 June 2013. The song peaked at number 31 on the UK Singles Chart.

Music video
The music video to accompany the release of "Wasting My Young Years" was first released on YouTube on 15 May 2013, and has 64 million views as of March 2021.

Track listing

Chart performance

Weekly charts

Year-end charts

Release history

References

2013 singles
London Grammar songs
2013 songs
Songs written by Hannah Reid